Statistics of International Soccer League in season 1965.

League standings

Section I

Section II

Championship finals

First leg

Second leg 

Polonia Bytom won 5–1 on aggregate.

American Challenge Cup
Polonia Bytom defeated FK Dukla Prague, 2–0 and 1–1, on goal aggregate.

References

International Soccer League seasons
International Soccer League, 1965